The National Institute of Design, Andhra Pradesh (NID - AP) is a design school in Guntur District, India. The institute started functioning on 7 September 2015.  It institute functions as an autonomous body under the Department of Industrial Policy and Promotion, Ministry of Commerce and Industry, Government of India.  It is temporarily at Acharya Nagarjuna University on Guntur - Vijayawada highway (NH 16) and will move to a permanent  campus
in Amaravati, the new capital city of Andhra Pradesh.

Courses offered 
The institute offers Bachelor of Design(B.Des) courses  in Industrial Design,Communication Design, Textile and Apparel Design.

Bachelor of Design (B.Des) 
This 4-year course is offered in three specializations by NID Andhra Pradesh. As the National Institute of Design Act 2019 was passed the institute will give B.Des instead of GDPD. This course has a total of 75 seats. Now NID Andhrapradesh is an Institute of National Importance( INI).

Infrastructure 
The transit campus for the institute has been set up at the EEE & ECE Block, Acharya Nagarjuna University. The current campus include Studios, Knowledge Management Centre (Library) and I.T. Lab. Also, the institute provides students with full-time internet access.

References

National Institutes of Design
Guntur
2015 establishments in Andhra Pradesh
Educational institutions established in 2015